Jonas Gerard Mkude (born 3 December 1992) is a Tanzanian footballer who plays a midfielder for Tanzanian club Simba SC and the Tanzania national team. He made his international debut on 23 February 2012 against the Democratic Republic of the Congo.

References

1992 births
Living people
Tanzanian footballers
Tanzania international footballers
Simba S.C. players
Association football midfielders
Tanzanian Premier League players